The 58th Dan Kolov & Nikola Petrov Tournament,  was a sport wrestling event held in  Plovdiv, Bulgaria between 8 and 11 April 2021.

This international tournament includes competition in both men's and women's freestyle wrestling and men's Greco-Roman wrestling. This tournament is held in honor of Dan Kolov who was the first European freestyle wrestling champion from Bulgaria and  European and World Champion Nikola Petroff.

Event videos
The event was air freely on the Bulgarian Wrestling Federation Live YouTube channel.

Medal table

Team ranking

Medal overview

Men's freestyle

Greco-Roman

Women's freestyle

Participating nations

233 competitors from 25 nations participated.
 (3)
 (3)
 (53)
 (1)
 (8)
 (7)
 (4)
 (2)
 (23)
 (3)
 (3)
 (3)
 (8)
 (8)
 (23)
 (3)
 (2)
 (2)
 (6)
 (11)
 (4)
 (24)
 (37)
 (4)
 (12)

References 

2021 in European sport
2021 in sport wrestling
April 2021 sports events in Europe
2021 in Bulgarian sport